Dark Valley is a 1943 Argentine film directed by Carlos F. Borcosque.

Cast
  María Duval
  Carlos Cores 
  Nélida Bilbao 
  Elisardo Santalla 
  Leticia Scury 
  Enrique García Satur 
  Juan Sarcione 
  Ada Cornaro 
  Rossina Grassi 
  Edgardo Morilla
  Enrique Chaico

References

External links
 

1943 films
1940s Spanish-language films
Argentine black-and-white films
Films directed by Carlos F. Borcosque
Argentine drama films
1943 drama films
1940s Argentine films